HMS Caterham was a Hunt-class minesweeper of the Royal Navy from World War I. She operated as a tender at the Navigation School.  She was decommissioned before the outbreak of the Second World War and was sold in 1935 to Cashmore, of Newport, Monmouthshire to be broken up.

See also
 Caterham, Surrey

References
 

 

Hunt-class minesweepers (1916)
Royal Navy ship names
1919 ships